The Sweetest Gift is the fourth studio album (and first Christmas album) by country singer Trisha Yearwood.

Composition and release 
Yearwood sings a mixture of familiar traditional and popular material, along with more recent compositions such as "It Wasn't His Child" and "There's a New Kid in Town". 

Two of its tracks managed to achieve positions near the lower end of the Billboard Hot Country Singles chart. "It Wasn't His Child" peaked at #60, and "Reindeer Boogie" at #63. The album rose to the #17 position in the Country Albums chart. A re-release of the album in 2000 has a different album cover, a promotional photograph taken during the Real Live Woman promotional period.

Reception 
The album was a given a positive review by Allmusic, receiving 4 out of 5 stars.

Track listing
"Sweet Little Jesus Boy" (Bob MacGimsey) – 2:42
"Reindeer Boogie" (Charlie Faircloth, Hank Snow, Cordia Volkmar) – 2:38
"Take a Walk Through Bethlehem" (Ashley Cleveland, John Barlow Jarvis, Wally Wilson) – 3:49
"Santa Claus Is Back in Town" (Jerry Leiber, Mike Stoller) – 3:00
"It Wasn't His Child" (Skip Ewing) – 3:54
"Away in a Manger" (traditional) – 2:39
"The Sweetest Gift" (James Coats) – 3:02
"There's a New Kid in Town" (Don Cook, Curly Putman, Keith Whitley) – 4:27
"Let It Snow! Let It Snow! Let It Snow!" (Sammy Cahn, Jule Styne) – 2:26
"The Christmas Song" (Mel Tormé, Robert Wells) – 3:58

Personnel

Musicians 

 Trisha Yearwood – lead vocals, harmony vocals (2, 5, 6, 7)
 Steve Nathan – keyboards (1), acoustic piano (2, 3, 5-10)
 Matt Rollings – acoustic piano (1)
 Becky Priest – acoustic piano (4)
 Billy Joe Walker Jr. – acoustic guitar (2, 3, 5-10)
 Bobby All – acoustic guitar (4)
 Biff Watson – acoustic guitar (7)
 Dann Huff – electric guitar (2)
 Brent Mason – electric guitar (3, 5-10)
 Johnny Garcia – electric guitar (4)
 Paul Franklin – steel guitar (2, 3, 5, 6, 8, 9, 10), dobro (7)
 Stuart Duncan – mandolin (7), fiddle (7)
 Dave Pomeroy – bass (2, 3, 5-10)
 Jay Hager – bass (4)
 Eddie Bayers – drums (2, 3, 5-10)
 Rick McClure – drums (4)
 Sam Bacco – percussion (3, 5, 9)
 Kirk "Jelly Roll" Johnson – harmonica (1, 10)
 Aubrey Haynie – fiddle (2)
 Heather Risser – fiddle (4)
 John Hobbs – string arrangements (5, 6, 8)
 Ashley Cleveland – harmony vocals (3)
 Garth Fundis – harmony vocals (5)
 Beth Yearwood Bernard – harmony vocals (7)

The Nashville String Machine
 Bob Mason – cello
 Jim Grosjean – viola
 Lee Larrison – viola
 Kristin Wilkinson – viola
 David Davidson – violin
 Connie Ellisor – violin
 Carl Gorodetzky – violin
 Pamela Sixfin – violin
 Alan Umstead – violin
 Mary Kathryn Vanosdale – violin

Production 
 Garth Fundis – producer, mixing 
 Gary Laney – recording
 Dave Sinko – recording, mixing 
 Carlos Grier – digital editing
 Denny Purcell – mastering
 Georgetown Masters (Nashville, Tennessee) – mastering location 
 Scott Paschall – production assistant
 Katherine DeVault – art direction, design
 Jim "Señor" McGuire – photography

2000 Reissue
 Randee St. Nicholas – photography
 Virginia Team – art direction
 Jerry Joyner – design
 Debra Wingo – hair stylist

Charts

Album

Singles

Certifications

References

MCA Records albums
Trisha Yearwood albums
Albums produced by Garth Fundis
Christmas albums by American artists
1994 Christmas albums
Country Christmas albums